Robert Wilbur Barton (July 30, 1941 – January 15, 2018) was an American professional baseball player. He played in Major League Baseball as a catcher from 1965 to 1974 for the San Francisco Giants, San Diego Padres and the Cincinnati Reds.

Barton made his Major League debut at the age of 22 on September 17, 1965, in a 9–1 Giants loss to the Milwaukee Braves at County Stadium, entering the game in the seventh inning, replacing catcher Jack Hiatt. He batted once, going 0–1 with a foulout. His first hit came in his next at-bat on September 28 in a 9–1 loss to the St. Louis Cardinals at San Francisco's Candlestick Park. Pinch-hitting for Baseball Hall of Famer Warren Spahn in the ninth inning, he singled off Larry Jaster.

Barton was primarily a backup catcher, playing behind Tom Haller with the Giants and Baseball Hall of Famer Johnny Bench with the Reds. His best statistical year as a hitter was as a starter for the 1971 Padres; in 121 games, he hit .250 with five home runs and 23 runs batted in along with 17 doubles. On defense, in 1971 he led National League catchers in runners caught stealing (42), percentage of runners caught stealing (51.2%) and errors committed (15) and was second in assists (67).

References

External links

1941 births
2018 deaths
Major League Baseball catchers
Baseball players from Ohio
San Francisco Giants players
San Diego Padres players
Cincinnati Reds players
Phoenix Giants players
Eugene Emeralds players
Tacoma Cubs players
Hastings Giants players
Atlanta Crackers players
Springfield Giants players
Fresno Giants players
People from Norwood, Ohio